Michael J Thomas is an American saxophonist, songwriter, and vocalist.

Life and career 
Thomas joined the Jive Rockets, which opened for the Brian Setzer Orchestra, Big Bad Voo Doo Daddy, and Bill Haley’s Original Comets.

Thomas released his first solo album, City Beat, in 2010, and wrote or co-wrote nine of the ten songs on the album. The track "Amante Del Vino" was featured in the movie Contagion. Thomas had his vocal debut in 2011 with a single titled “I Think About Amy,” which was released on Woodward Avenue Records and hit #16 on the Billboard Smooth Jazz Airplay chart.

His album, Driven, was released on Harbor Breeze Records in 2017, and Thomas was involved in the writing on all of the tracks. The lead single, "Baby Coffee", hit #1 on Billboard's Smooth Jazz Chart for four weeks. It was also a song of the day on Jazziz.

His cover of "I'll Never Love Again" from the movie A Star is Born earned him another #1 on Billboard's Smooth Jazz Charts. In 2020, Thomas released the EP, Stream'n Love with the lead single, "Sippin' The Yak", written by Thomas and Trammell Starks.

Discography

References 

American male jazz musicians
American male saxophonists
American jazz soprano saxophonists
American jazz alto saxophonists
American jazz tenor saxophonists
Musicians from Kentucky
Year of birth missing (living people)
Living people
People from Hardin County, Kentucky